DxO PhotoLab is a proprietary non-destructive raw image processing software by DxO Labs, first released as OpticsPro in 2004. It is known particularly for its detailed optical corrections that are available for over 20,000 lens-camera combinations.

Its user interface uses trademarked names for several of its modules. Specifically, it includes a noise reduction function called "PRIME" (Probabilistic Raw IMage Enhancement), a haze removal feature called "ClearView", and its highlight recovery is called "Smart Lighting". In the Preset Editor, preset effects can be previewed on a grid.

The software is available in two editions, Essential and Elite. The Essential edition lacks the ClearView and PRIME modules.

References

External links
PCMag review
Digital Camera World review
Shutterbug review

Raster graphics editors